Kyle Kramer (born January 12, 1967) is a former American football defensive back. He played for the Cleveland Browns in 1989.

References

1967 births
Living people
American football defensive backs
Bowling Green Falcons football players
Cleveland Browns players